

2000
In 2000, 15 people received the Ekushey Padak, two of them posthumously:

 Ekhlas Uddin Ahmed, literature
 Mohiuddin Ahmed, politics (posthumous)
 Rafiq Uddin Ahmed, language martyr
 Abul Barkat, language martyr
 Syed Abdul Hadi, music
 Gaziul Haque, Language Movement
 Khalid Hossain, music
 Nilima Ibrahim, education
 Jamal Nazrul Islam, science and technology
 Abdul Jabbar, language martyr
 Abdullah Al Mamun, drama
 Zahidur Rahim, music (posthumous)
 Sofiur Rahman, language martyr
 Abdus Salam, language martyr
 Shamim Sikder, sculpture

2001
In 2001, one organization and 11 people received the Ekushey Padak:

 The Mother Language Lovers Of The World, for its contribution to the declaration of 21 February as International Mother Language Day
 Foni Borua, music
 Shyamoli Nasrin Chowdhury, education
 Nirmalendu Goon, literature
 Zia Haider, literature
 Rafiqul Islam, education
 Binoy Bashi Joldas, instrumental music
 Shah Abdul Karim, folk song
 Abdul Matin, Language Movement
 Golam Mustafa, film
 Ataur Rahman, drama
 Mahadev Saha, literature

2002
In 2002, 14 people received the Ekushey Padak, seven of them posthumously:

 Sufia Ahmed, flourishing culture and Language Movement
 Gazi Mazharul Anwar, music
 Abul Kalam Azad, education (posthumously) 
 Abdul Hamid Khan Bhashani, Language Movement (posthumously)
 Ahmed Sofa, literature (posthumously)
 Monzur Hossain, Language Movement (posthumously)
 Sharif Hossain, education
 Serajur Rahman, journalism
 Abdur Jabbar Khan, film (posthumously)
 Sadek Khan, Language Movement and film
 Kazi Golam Mahbub, Language Movement
 Pratibha Mutsuddi, education
 Muhammad Shahidullah, literature and Language Movement (posthumously)
 Ramesh Shil, Gano Sangeet (posthumously)

2003
12 persons were awarded.

 Muhammad Shamsul Huq
 Muhammad Ekramul Huq
 Zebunnessa Rahman
 Zobeda Khanum
 Abdul Mannan Syed
 Al Mujahidi
 Anjuman Ara Begum
 Lokman Hossain Fakir
 Khan Ataur Rahman
 Abdul Hamid
 Nazim Uddin Mostan
 UNESCO

2004

In 2004, 10 people received the Ekushey Padak, two of them posthumously.
 Mohammad Moniruzzaman Miah (education)
 Wakil Ahmed (research)
 Farida Hossain (literature)
 Nilufar Yasmin (music, posthumously)
 Moniruzzaman Monir (music)
 Mustafa Manwar (fine arts)
 Nawab Faizunnesa (social service, posthumously)
 Zobaida Hannan (social service)
 A.Z.M. Enayetullah Khan (journalism)
 Chashi Nazrul Islam (film)

2005
14 persons received the award.
 Saifur Rahman (language movement)
 Khandaker Delwar Hossain (language movement)
 Syed Mujtaba Ali (literature)
 Abdullah Abu Sayeed (education)
 Iqbal Mahmud (education)
 Zubaida Gulshan Ara (literature)
 Mohammad Abdul Gafur (language movement)
 Abu Saleh (literature)
 Ashab Uddin Ahmed (literature)
 Chittaranjan Saha (education)
 Srimat Bishuddh-ananda Mahathero (social service)
 Bashir Ahmed (music)
 Apel Mahmood (music)
 Md Mashir Hossain (journalism)

2006
In 2006, 13 people received the Ekushey Padak, three of them posthumously:

 Aftab Ahmed, photography
 Jasimuddin Ahmed, education
 M. Asaduzzaman, education
 Sukomal Barua, education
 Anwara Begum, education
 Shahadat Chowdury, journalism (posthumous)
 Nurul Islam, literature (posthumous)
 Anwaruddin Khan, music (posthumous)
 Gaziul Hasan Khan, journalism
 Hamiduzzaman Khan, sculpture
 Abul Kalam Monjur Morshed, literature
 Rawshan Ara Mustafiz, music
 Fatema Tuz Zohra, music

2007
In 2007, five people received the Ekushey Padak, two of them posthumously.

 M A Beg, photography (posthumous)
 Selim Al Deen, drama
 Mohammad Mahfuzullah, literature
 Anwar Pervez, music (posthumous)
 Muhammad Habibur Rahman, literature

2008
In 2008, nine people received the Ekushey Padak, four of them posthumously.

 Muzaffar Ahmed, education
 Khandaker Nurul Alam, music
 Shyam Sundar Baishnab, music (posthumous)
 Najma Chowdhury, research
 Shefali Ghosh, music (posthumous)
 Waheedul Haq, music (posthumous)
 Zohra Begum Kazi, social work (posthumous)
 Dilwar Khan, literature
 Khaleque Nawaz Khan, language

2009
In 2009, 13 people received the Ekushey Padak, three of them posthumously.

 Burhanuddin Khan Jahangir (education)
 Syed Anwar Hossain (research)
 Mahbub Ul Alam Choudhury (language movement)
 Ashraf Uz Zaman Khan (journalism)
 Begum Bilkis Nasir Uddin (journalism)
 Manik Chandra Saha (journalism)
 Humayun Kabir Balu (journalism)
 Selina Hossain (literature)
 Shamsuzzaman Khan (research)
 Qazi Kholiquzzaman Ahmad (poverty reduction)
 Mohammad Rafi Khan (social service)
 Monsur Ul Karim (fine arts)
 Ramendu Majumdar (theatre)

References

Civil awards and decorations of Bangladesh
Recipients of the Ekushey Padak